Kevin Aliaj (born 5 August 1999) is an Albanian footballer who plays as a midfielder for Bylis in the Kategoria Superiore in Albania.

Career

Bylis
Aliaj made his competitive debut for the club on 23 February 2019, playing the entirety of a 1-0 away victory over Oriku during league play. He scored his first goal in official competition for the club later that season, netting in the 92nd minute of a 5-2 victory over Egnatia in late March.

References

External links
Kevin Aliaj at SofaScore

1999 births
Living people
KF Bylis Ballsh players
Kategoria Superiore players
Kategoria e Parë players
Albanian footballers
Association football midfielders